The Independent Educational Consultants Association is a professional organization for educational consultants, representing school and college admission counselors working in private practice. The organization, founded in 1976, represents educational consultants who advise students and families on admission to private schools, colleges, summer programs, gap year opportunities or other educational programs. Headquartered in Fairfax, Virginia in suburban Washington DC, IECA establishes Principles of Good Practice, holds training programs for those entering the field, hosts two international conferences each year, coordinates counselor tours of college and school campuses, and publishes a variety of materials.

As of 2022 IECA currently has nearly 2600 members, about 90% of whom are located in the United States.  The primary work of IECA is to provide education, training and networking opportunities to those in the profession, to provide ethical guidelines to those practicing, to serve as spokespersons for the profession to the higher education community and press, and to advocate for ethical consultants and their student-clients when legislation is considered by any state or federal government. IECA programs are offered both virtually and in-person throughout the year and include tours of college and school campuses to keep members up-to-date.

Membership in the Independent Educational Consultants Association requires a minimum of three years of admission experience, a master's degree or higher, having visited and evaluated a minimum of 50 campuses, providing references from among both professional colleagues and parents, and having marketing materials thoroughly reviewed by a panel of peers.

The association established the IECA Foundation, which seeks to support programs providing educational and college counseling to students and communities who could not normally afford such services. In the past decade, the foundation provided more than a half-million dollars in support to groups across the United States. IECA itself makes its information available, via its website, to parents and students who might not be able to afford the cost of an IEC.

The association's executive officer is Mark Sklarow, an educational professional who has served as executive director of Presidential Classroom and City at Peace, two not-for-profit educational organizations. Sklarow is a former school dean in Philadelphia where he taught high school social science and political science at the university level and served as director of student councils in the City of Philadelphia and director of summer leadership programs in the Commonwealth of Pennsylvania.  He currently serves on the advisory board of the IEC certificate program of the University of California/Irvine extension and the Board of Directors of the Character Collaborative, an organization seeking to raise the importance of non-academic attributes in college admission.

References

External links
 Independent Educational Consultants Association

Educational organizations based in the United States